
Year 257 BC was a year of the pre-Julian Roman calendar. At the time it was known as the Year of the Consulship of Regulus and Blasio (or, less frequently, year 497 Ab urbe condita). The denomination 257 BC for this year has been used since the early medieval period, when the Anno Domini calendar era became the prevalent method in Europe for naming years.

Events 
 By place 
 Roman Republic 
 The Romans attack Sardinia and try to capture it from the Carthaginians.
 The Battle of Tyndaris is fought between the Roman fleet (with Gaius Atilius Regulus in command) and the Carthaginian fleet off Tyndaris (modern Tindari) in Sicily. Hiero II, tyrant of Syracuse, has allowed Tyndaris to be a base for the Carthaginians. However, after this battle, the town falls to Roman forces.

 China 
 The Qin siege of Handan, the capital of the State of Zhao:
 The State of Chu and the State of Wei send armies to assist Zhao against the Qin, and they defeat the Qin army of Wang He outside Handan. This forces Wang He to lift the siege.
 The Qin general Bai Qi is executed for his refusal to take command of the siege.

 Vietnam 
 Thục Phán (An Dương Vương), Chief of the Thục Tribe of the Âu Việts, defeats the Văn Lang Confederacy and unifies all Âu Việt and Lạc Việt tribes, thus founding the Kingdom of Âu Lạc and the Thục dynasty.

Births 
 Aristophanes of Byzantium, Greek scholar and grammarian (approximate date)

Deaths 
 Bai Qi, Chinese general of the Qin State (Warring States Period)

References